OGLE-TR-132 is a distant magnitude 15.72 star in the star fields of the constellation Carina. Because of its great distance, about 4,900 light-years, and location in the crowded field it was not notable in any way. Because its apparent brightness changes when one of its planets transits, the star has been given the variable star designation V742 Carinae.  The spectral type of the star is type F. A yellow-white, very metal-rich dwarf star, it is slightly hotter and more luminous than the Sun.

Planetary system 
In 2003 the Optical Gravitational Lensing Experiment (OGLE) detected periodic dimming in the star's light curve indicating a transiting, planetary-sized object. Since low-mass red dwarfs and brown dwarfs may mimic a planet radial velocity measurements were necessary to calculate the mass of the body. In 2004 the object was proved to be a new transiting extrasolar planet, OGLE-TR-132b.

See also 
 Optical Gravitational Lensing Experiment
 OGLE-TR-113
Lists of exoplanets

References

External links 
 

F-type main-sequence stars
Planetary transit variables
Carina (constellation)
Planetary systems with one confirmed planet
Carinae, V742